A list of films released in Japan in 1963 (see 1963 in film).

List of films

See also 
1963 in Japan
1963 in Japanese television

References

Footnotes

Sources

External links
Japanese films of 1963 at the Internet Movie Database

1963
Japanese
Films